Hornchurch Country Park is a 104.5-hectare park on the former site of Hornchurch Airfield, south of Hornchurch in the London Borough of Havering, east London.

The Site 

The River Ingrebourne passes through the park and if forms part of Thames Chase Community Forest. The most popular part of the park is to the west of the Ingrebourne, where the ground is flat and paved and frequently visited by dog walkers. The woodland to the east of the river is somewhat inaccessible. Some southern parts of the park that reach into Rainham have been historically used as landfill.

There is a fishing lake located within the park alongside many paths that connect neighbouring areas, such as Upminster, Dagenham and Rainham.

There are a number of Pillboxes and other historic installations dating from the Second World War to be found in the park.

The park is a Site of Borough Importance for Nature Conservation, Grade I. Almost all of it falls within the Ingrebourne Valley Local Nature Reserve, with the eastern edge forming part of the Ingrebourne Marshes Site of Special Scientific Interest.

There is access from Airfield Way/Squadron's Approach, off South End Road.

The COVID-19 Memorial Woodland 

At a ceremony on March 23rd 2022, the Mayor of Havering joined representatives of the Council, Borough, voluntary sector and families of the deceased to officially open the COVID-19 Memorial Woodland in the south of Hornchurch Country Park. The opening ceremony coincided with the National Day of Remembrance, marking the second anniversary of the first UK Lockdown. 

The Memorial Woodland consists of over 4000 trees planted by volunteers, alongside sponsored memorial benches, wildflowers and a wetland area, aims to remember all those who lost their lives, the significant efforts and sacrifices of key workers and all that our communities endured throughout the COVID-19 pandemic. The location of the memorial is significant as it is centrally located within the borough and acknowledges the role that our parks played in supporting the mental and physical health of our residents during lockdowns. 

Alongside honouring those who lost their lives during the COVID-19 Pandemic, the Memorial Woodland also contributes to fighting climate change and aiding local biodiversity. For example, a swale (a shallow dry channel) was included to combat flooding in the area, a variety of trees have been planted (including berrying and flowering species) to aid birds and insects, and grass rides were incorporated to create an excess of woodland edge, the ideal habitat for butterflies.

References

Sources

External links
 'Home of the woodpecker-riding weasel': Park sign makes it 'official'

Parks and open spaces in the London Borough of Havering
Country parks in London